Nosratollah Amini was an Iranian lawyer and politician. He served as the mayor of Tehran between 1952 and 1953, and after the Iranian Revolution briefly held office as the governor of Fars Province.

Amini was personal attorney of Mohammad Mossadegh.

References

 
 
 
 
 

1915 births
2009 deaths
National Front (Iran) politicians
Mayors of Tehran
Iranian emigrants to the United States
People from Arak, Iran
People with acquired American citizenship
Deaths from pneumonia in Virginia
20th-century Iranian lawyers